Crystel Fournier is a French cinematographer. She is best known for being the frequent collaborator of director Céline Sciamma.

Career
Fournier began work as a cinematographer in 1998. She began working with director Céline Sciamma on her 2007 debut film Water Lilies. They continued their collaborations of the films Tomboy and Girlhood. In 2016, Fournier was invited to join the cinematography branch of the Academy of Motion Picture Arts and Sciences.

Selected filmography 

 Drift (2023)
 Great Freedom (2021)
 Wildfire (2020)
 Miss Marx (2020)
 Nico, 1988 (2017)
 Paris Can Wait (2016)
 The Boss's Daughter (2015)
 These Are the Rules (2014)
 Girlhood (2014)
 Smart Ass (2014)
 A Place on Earth (2013)
 Aujourd'hui (2012)
 Tomboy (2011)
 Living on Love Alone (2010)
 Un soir au club (2009)
 Water Lilies (2007)
 Rêves de poussière (2006)
 Burnt Out (2005)
 Carnage (2002)
 Clément'' (2001)

References

External links
 

Living people
French cinematographers
French women cinematographers
Year of birth missing (living people)